Tonenke is a village in Yasynuvata Raion (district) in Donetsk Oblast of eastern Ukraine, at 23.5 km NW from the centre of Donetsk city.

The War in Donbass, that started in mid-April 2014, has brought along both civilian and military casualties. One civilian was killed by shelling on 12 November 2016. One Ukrainian serviceman was killed on 31 January 2017.

Demographics
Native language as of the Ukrainian Census of 2001:
Ukrainian — 65.94%
Russian 33.44%
Polish — 0.31%

References

External links
 Weather forecast for Tonenke

Villages in Pokrovsk Raion